The 2013–14 Xavier Musketeers men's basketball team represented Xavier University during the 2013–14 NCAA Division I men's basketball season. Led by fifth year head coach Chris Mack, they played their games at the Cintas Center and were first year members of the newly reorganized Big East Conference. They finished the season 21–13, 10–8 in Big East play to finish in a three-way tie for third place. They advanced to the semifinals of the Big East tournament where they lost to Creighton. They received an at-large bid to the NCAA tournament where they lost in the First Round ("First Four") to NC State.

Previous season
The Musketeers finished the 2012–13 season with a record of 17–14, 9–7 in Atlantic 10 play for a tie for sixth place. They lost in the first round of the A-10 tournament to Saint Joseph's. This season marked Xavier's final season in the A-10.

Roster

Departures

Schedule

|-
!colspan=9 style="background:#062252; color:#FFFFFF;"| Exhibition

|-
!colspan=9 style="background:#062252; color:#FFFFFF;"| Regular season

|-
!colspan=9 style="background:#062252; color:#FFFFFF;"| Big East Conference Regular season

|-
!colspan=9 style="background:#062252; color:#FFFFFF;"| Big East tournament

|-
!colspan=9 style="background:#062252; color:#FFFFFF;"| NCAA tournament

Notes

References

Xavier Musketeers men's basketball seasons
Xavier
Xavier